Abdulla Oripov (Uzbek: Абдулла Орипов) may refer to:

Abdulla Oripov (poet) (1941–2016), Uzbek poet
Abdulla Oripov (politician) (born 1961), Uzbek Prime Minister